On the Frontiers is volume thirteen in the French comic book (or bande dessinée) science fiction series Valérian and Laureline created by writer Pierre Christin and artist Jean-Claude Mézières.

Synopsis
On a luxury space liner, one of the passengers, Kistna, is delighted to discover a fellow member of her race, the Wûûrm, called Jal is also travelling on the liner. The Wûûrm are declining in numbers and so to meet a fellow member of the species is a special occasion. After enjoying themselves in the ship's casino and the ballroom, Kistna invites Jal to her cabin to consummate their new-found union. In the cabin, Kistna removes the golden armour that completely covers her body. Jal follows suit, removing his armour to reveal that he is, in fact, a human and not a Wûûrm after all. Jal attacks her and succeeds in his mission – to steal Kistna's psychic powers. Wracked with guilt following his deed, Jal puts his disguise back on and makes for the bridge of the ship. He uses his newfound powers to threaten the captain and procure a shuttle craft. He sets the controls for Earth...

Earth, the late 1980s. Valérian is in Russia, having been hired to examine a leak at a nuclear power plant. His investigations lead him to the conclusion that this accident was deliberately provoked. His work with the Russians finished, they arrange to have him returned to the West where he rendezvous with Laureline and Albert on the Finnish border. Travelling across Finland into Norway they fly off to their next destination in a seaplane.

Later, Valérian, Laureline and Albert are to be found at a café in a small village in Tunisia. As they wait, they ponder the job they have been asked to work on: none of them, not even Albert, knows who has hired them nor what they are supposed to be doing in Tunisia. Noticing a group of cloaked men heading into the palm forest near the village. Valérian and Laureline follow them to a marabout. Using a scanning device, taken from their astroship, they determine that there is a radioactive source inside the marabout. Returning to the village, they report their findings to Albert who makes a call to their mysterious employers. Then they make for the marabout in their truck. Using a cretiniser whip from the planet Phoum, a device that renders its victims cataleptic, they enter the marabout and find the source of the radiation – an atomic mine. Deactivating the mine, they flee into the desert to an arranged meeting point near the Libyan border. At the rendezvous they are met by a Tunisian military helicopter. Flying along the Libyan border, their host explains that had the mine been detonated, it would have incited the world powers to respond with a nuclear attack of their own, giving Libya the excuse to invade and destabilise North Africa and precipitate a World war. The helicopter flies on to an airfield where Valérian, Laureline and Albert are collected by a jet aircraft.

Some time later, the trio are in the United States in Arizona, driving along the border with Mexico. At last, they meet their employers – J.D. Eklund, a professor from UCLA attached to the International Atomic Energy Agency and Ivan Gregorian, a commander of the Red Army in charge of nuclear disarmament surveillance. They inform them that there have been multiple alerts at nuclear installations around the world and none of the incidents are coincidental – all of these blackmail incidents are being orchestrated by a single mastermind. They bring Valérian, Laureline and Albert to a bridge where a convoy of trucks carrying plutonium has been attacked by terrorists threatening to blow up the trucks unless a nuclear submarine is delivered to a port of their choice in the Yellow Sea. However, the intelligence services had received a tipoff about the attack and the trucks, which are in fact empty, are blown up by the US Army. The victory is short-lived however: the train that is carrying the real plutonium is attacked and derailed forcing them to capitulate to the demands for the submarine. One lead still remains however – a mysterious stranger who is winning at the casinos in Hong Kong.

Laureline arrives at the casino in Hong Kong, wearing a Tüm Tüm (de Lüm) in her hair as a spying device, and finds Jal playing in a high-stakes card game. Glancing at Laureline, Jal recognises the Tüm Tüm and snatches it from her hair. He then grabs Laureline, stuffs her in his car and drives over the border with China. Arriving at his home, Jal interrogates Laureline asking if she is from another world or from the future. Slipping to the bathroom, Laureline takes a Tchoung tracer from her handbag and releases it in the hope that it can find Valérian.

Elsewhere, one of the waiters in the casino has found the Tüm Tüm and returned it to Valérian and Albert who have returned to Inverloch Castle in Scotland to ponder their next move. Examining its eye, Valérian finds it has succeeded in recording an image of their quarry. Valérian is shocked to realise he recognises their adversary – it is Jal, an agent of the Spatio-Temporal Service just like Valérian and Laureline. Valérian is puzzled that Jal hasn't disappeared along with Galaxity and the rest of the future Earth. At this point the Tchoung tracer arrives. Analysing its database, they discover Jal's location in China. Parting company with Albert, Valérian takes the astroship to China, to Jal's hideout. Valérian confronts Jal, who is amazed when he recognises Valérian. Jal reveals that he is attempting to cause the nuclear cataclysm that Valérian prevented in The Rage of Hypsis so that Galaxity can be restored to the timeline. He explains that the peculiar properties of the Neferfalen nebula where he was exploring protected him from being wiped out along with the rest of Galaxity but at the cost of the woman he had loved. In order to get her back, Jal is attempting to change history back onto its old course. As the standoff continues, Jal's powers become weaker and weaker until eventually he is overcome by Valérian and Laureline.

Valérian and Laureline fly Jal to Point Central, the meeting place for all the races of the cosmos, and make for the Pulpissm's market where they meet the Shingouz. Laureline asks the Shingouz if they can find any other remnants of old Earth. Waiting at the market, they eventually receive a message from the Shingouz – at the far side of Point Central they have found a place beyond a material border where the remains of lost and fallen civilisations can be found. Reaching the place they find the ruined remains of Earth's old segment in Point Central. Realising that he was a fool to think he could change history, Jal elects to be left alone with his thoughts on the abandoned segment.

Principal characters
 Valérian, from Galaxity, lost capital of Earth in the 28th century, formerly a Spatio-Temporal Agent, now working on a freelance basis
 Laureline, from 11th century France, formerly a Spatio-Temporal Agent for Galaxity, now working on a freelance basis
 Mr Albert, Valérian and Laureline's contact on 20th century Earth
 Jal, a spatio-temporal agent from Galaxity
 Kistna, a female from the planet Wûûrm
 The captain of the luxury liner where Jal meets Kistna
 A fisherman from Lapland
 J.D. Eklund, professor from UCLA, detached to the International Atomic Energy Agency
 Ivan Gregorian, Commander, Red Army, Nuclear Disarmament Surveillance
 Chang Te'Kun, the richest arms dealer in Singapore
 James, butler to Lord and Lady Seal of Inverloch Castle
 The Shingouz, three aliens who trade in information

Settings
 A great luxury space liner, occupied by passengers from many different races, that is passing through the Solar System
 Earth, the late 1980s, some time between the Chernobyl accident in 1986 and the collapse of the Iron Curtain in 1989. The pursuit of the mastermind behind the attempts to start a nuclear incident takes them across the borders of many countries:
 Lapland: the nuclear centre Valérian visits is in Russia. He then crosses the border into Finland across a lake where he meets Laureline and Albert. They then drive into Norway where they pick up a hydroplane.
 Tunisia, an oasis, in the Tunisian Sahara in the south of the country, about 15 miles from the border with Libya. The village has a cafe called the Cafe Pigalle. A marabout lies in palm forest outside the village. The Tunisian commandos that Valérian, Albert and Laureline meet in the desert take them briefly into Libya before leaving them at an airfield where they move on to their next destination.
 United States, Arizona near the border with Mexico. The exact location of the hijacked trucks is not specified but the train carrying the nuclear material is derailed nearby in Yuma, Arizona. Valérian, Laureline and Albert depart for China from Luke Air Force Base.
 Hong Kong, a casino where Jal is using the powers he stole from Kistna to win the money to finance his operations.
 Scotland, Inverloch Castle in the Scottish Highlands where Valérian's astroship remains hidden in Lord and Lady Seal's greenhouse (see also The Ghosts of Inverloch and The Rage of Hypsis).
 The People's Republic of China, Jal's house, located not far from the border with Hong Kong.
 Point Central, the giant space station that acts as a meeting place for all the races of the cosmos, as seen previously in Ambassador of the Shadows. The segments visited belong to:
 The Ombrians, giant worm-like creatures.
 The Pulpissms, briefly seen in Ambassador of the Shadows, whose giant market, the busiest place on Point Central, attracts visitors, including spies of every race, from all over the station.
 Earth. Although Galaxity is no more, this segment, which is all crumbling and decayed and deserted, lies beyond an immaterial border that links fallen civilisations.

Notes

 This was the first Valérian adventure to make its debut in print in album format. All previous stories were first serialised in Pilote magazine.
 This adventure marks the first appearance in the series of the following elements:
 The Cretiniser from Phoum, whip like device that renders anyone within its range catatonic.
 The Tüm Tüm (de Lüm), a working animal which can be worn in the hair as a decoration but can be used as a spy camera thanks to the retinal persistence of its eye.
 The Tchoung Tracer, another working animal that can be freeze dried until needed, at which time it is revived by adding water. It can be trained to home in on a specific person and its point of origin can then be determined by scanning its brain.
 The design of the space liner seen at the start of this adventure was later re-used by Mézières as the basis for the Fhloston Paradise liner seen in the 1997 Luc Besson film The Fifth Element on which he worked as a conceptual artist.
 This album was translated into English by Timothy Ryan Smith and published, along with The Living Weapons and The Circles of Power in the same volume, in November 2004 by iBooks under the title Valerian: The New Future Trilogy. The pages were shrunk from their normal size to US comic book size.
 The English translation introduces a number of changes and discrepancies into the text:
 The Russians pay Valérian in Euro currency even though this story is set more than a decade before its introduction in 2002.
 Lord and Lady Seal are referred to as Lord and Lady Steals.
 The Pulpissms' segment, with its great market, is referred to as the Pulp Market. The translator did not realise that the Pulpissms are an alien race.
 Kistna's race is not named in the text of the album itself – however, they are given the race name Wûûrm in Les Habitants du Ciel: Atlas Cosmique de Valérian et Laureline, the illustrated encyclopedia of the Valérian universe.

References
 Mézières, J-C. and Christin, P.(1991), Les Habitants du Ciel: Atlas Cosmique de Valérian et Laureline, Dargaud, Paris, 
 Mézières, J-C. (1998), Les Extras de Mézières No.2 (Mon Cinquieme Element), Dargaud, Paris, 
 Mézières, J-C. and Christin, P.(2004), Valerian: The New Future Trilogy, trans. T.R. Smith, iBooks, New York, 

1988 graphic novels
Valérian and Laureline